Louis Wilkinson (born 19 November 1966) is a South African cricketer. He played in 118 first-class and 137 List A matches from 1986/87 to 2002/03.

References

External links
 

1966 births
Living people
South African cricketers
Boland cricketers
Free State cricketers
People from Vereeniging